Gaiole in Chianti is a comune (municipality) in the Province of Siena in the Italian region Tuscany, located about  southeast of Florence and about  northeast of Siena. Forbes named it number one in its list of "Europe's Most Idyllic Places To Live."

Each year in March, a professional bicycle race is held, known as Strade Bianche in reference to the white gravel roads of the Sienna region. In October there is a public event, using many of the same roads, for vintage bicycle enthusiasts known as L'Eroica. This starts and finishes in Gaiole including a full week of festivities.

Main sights
Castello di Brolio castle and vineyard (11th century).
Abbey of Coltibuono
Pieve of San Marcellino, of medieval origin. It was mostly rebuilt in the 14th century.
Pieve of San Polo Rosso, dating from the 12th century. It is now part of a 14th-century defensive structure. The interior has a nave with two aisles and an apse.
Pieve of San Giusto in Salcio
Romanesque Pieve of Santa Maria a Spaltenna, known from 1030.
Pieve of San Bartolomeo a Vertine (11th century). It was once home of an early work by Simone Martini and a triptych by Bicci di Lorenzo, now in the Siena Pinacoteca. Some fragmentary medieval frescoes still remain on exhibit today.
Pieve of San Vincenti.
Castello di Tornano castle and vineyard.

People
 Bettino Ricasoli (1809–1880), Prime Minister of the Kingdom of Italy, who created the Chianti recipe of 70% Sangiovese, 15% Canaiolo and 15% Malvasia bianca

See also
History of Chianti

References

External links

 Official website
 Chianti historical site (Tourist Information Office)